Oakle Street is a village in Gloucestershire, England.

External links

Churcham Village Website - a community project

Villages in Gloucestershire